The Port National Company (Empresa Nacional Portuaria, or ENP) of Honduras is a decentralized organization responsible for activities related to the administration of ships, loads, and works in the national ports. It has jurisdiction in all the maritime ports of Honduras. It was founded on October 14, 1965, under the government of President Oswaldo López Arellano.

Functions and responsibilities
The ENP oversees port functions. It coordinates port activities and administration of ships that enter and leave the country, and control the storage, movement, and custody of loads, among other functions.

Ports operated by the Port National Company
The ENP operates in the following ports:
 Puerto Cortés 
 La Ceiba
 Puerto Castilla
 San Lorenzo

See also
 Hondutel
 Empresa Nacional de Energía Eléctrica (National Electrical Energy Company)

References

External links
 Official site of the ENP

Companies of Honduras